Alvaro Joshua Lamas (born December 19, 1983) is an American actor.

Career
Lamas is best known for his role as Rafael Ortega on As the World Turns, Simon McCrae on Gigantic, and as Cisco Gonzalez on American Family. He also appeared with his family on the E! reality show Leave It to Lamas.

In 2001, Lamas was awarded Model of the Year and Young Adult Actor of the Year from the International Model & Talent Association. In 2003, he was Mr. Golden Globe alongside Dominik Garcia-Lorido, daughter of Andy García, at the 60th Golden Globe Awards.

Personal life
He is the son of actor Lorenzo Lamas and brother to model and actress Shayne Lamas, and grandson to Fernando Lamas and Arlene Dahl.

Legal issues

In 2012, Lamas was accused of breaking into his ex-girlfriend's home (Jessie Schulman) and holding her captive in the bathroom. Schulman filed a restraining order, claiming she broke up with A.J. and moved on to a new relationship. Lamas denied the incident saying he was only trying to talk to Schulman.

Also in 2012, Lamas was arrested for DUI; he pleaded guilty and was sentenced to 36 months probation and $1,600 in fines.

In 2015, Lamas was arrested after allegedly shoplifting at Target and assaulting a security guard.

Filmography

Film

Television

References

External links

1983 births
Living people
21st-century American male actors
Male actors from Los Angeles County, California
American male television actors
American male soap opera actors